Yelena Turysheva (born January 29, 1986) is a Russian cross-country skier who has competed since 2006. She finished 35th in the individual sprint event at the 2010 Winter Olympics in Vancouver.

Turysheva's best World Cup finish was eighth in an individual sprint event in Russia in January 2010.

Cross-country skiing results
All results are sourced from the International Ski Federation (FIS).

Olympic Games

World Cup

Season standings

References

External links

1986 births
Cross-country skiers at the 2010 Winter Olympics
Living people
Olympic cross-country skiers of Russia
Russian female cross-country skiers